The United States federal budget for fiscal year 2023 runs from October 1, 2022, to September 30, 2023. The government was initially funded through a series of three temporary continuing resolutions. The final funding package was passed as an omnibus spending bill, the Consolidated Appropriations Act, 2023.

Budget proposal 
The Biden administration budget proposal was released in March 2022.

Appropriations legislation 

The Consolidated Appropriations Act, 2023 is a $1.7 trillion omnibus spending bill that was signed by President Joe Biden on December 29, 2022.

References

External links 
 Appropriations status table on Congress.gov

United States federal budgets by year
117th United States Congress
2022 in American politics
2023 government budgets